There exist a number of Antarctic churches, including both Christian churches on Antarctica proper and those that were built south of the Antarctic Convergence. According to the 6th article of the Antarctic Treaty, Antarctica is defined politically as all land and ice shelves south of the 60th parallel, while the nearest natural boundary is the Antarctic Convergence.

There are eight churches on Antarctica proper,
with another two located south of the Antarctic Convergence. The southernmost of these religious buildings is the Chapel of Our Lady of the Snows, a Catholic chapel carved out of the ice surrounding the Belgrano II Base, at Bertrab Nunatak. While there are currently only a few freestanding structures dedicated solely to Christian religions, most research stations have small meeting rooms that are dual-purposed partially for religious services. These rooms are also commonly used by adherents of other world religions. The Chapel of the Snows also hosts services for other faith groups such as Latter Day Saints, Baháʼí, and Buddhism. These religious structures serve the entire population of Antarctica, which varies from approximately 4,400 in summer to 1,100 in winter. This population is spread across approximately 40 year-round stations and a range of summer-only stations, camps, and refuges.

Churches
This list catalogs churches and other religious buildings built south of the 60th parallel.

Antarctic Churches not on Antarctica

This list catalogs churches and other religious buildings built south of the Antarctic Convergence, but north of the 60th parallel.

Map

See also

 Religion in Antarctica

References

Church
 
Lists of churches